Duda Yankovich (born September 27, 1976) is a Serbian-born former boxer and mixed martial arts fighter. She has been living in Brazil since 1999. Yankovich was the Women's International Boxing Association (WIBA) 2006 light welterweight world champion.

Martial arts
Involved in martial arts since the age of 11, Yankovich was the youngest black belt in the history of Shotokan karate in Serbia. In 1994, she competed in the European Championships in Prague, winning a silver medal. That same year, she also won the bronze medal at the Junior World Championships in Zakopane, Poland. She also became involved in kickboxing and became Serbia Kickboxing Champion in 1996–1999, and Balkan Champion in 1998 and 1999. Yankovich moved to Brazil in 1999, as a result of the Yugoslav civil war, and became Brazilian Kickboxing Champion in 2001–2003.

Boxing
In 2002, she became involved with amateur boxing, training for four months with the team of former world champion, Acelino Freitas. In 2005, Yankovich represented Brazil in the First Pan-American female boxing amateur championship in Buenos Aires, Argentina. She took third place and a bronze medal in the 138-lb division.

On 23 July 2005, she made her professional boxing debut against Argentinian, Wilhelmina Fernandez. She won on in fourth round by knockout. Then she brought three more fights, winning all by knockout. During this time, Yankovich chose to abandon kickboxing competitions and to dedicate her time to reaching a World Title race in Boxing.

World champion
After two more international victories, Yankovich become a contender for a Women's International Boxing Association (WIBA) title in the category of super light. She won this World Title dispute by a unanimous decision.

After the world title win in November 2006, Yankovich made her first defense of the World Title on March 17, 2007, against American Belinda Laracuente, winning by points in a challenge that lasted 10 rounds. Soon after she won against Colombian Paola Rojas in São Paulo and then also won against the Colombian Liliana Palmera in Campo Grande – MS. In April 2008 Yankovich gave a rematch to Darys Pardo and again beat the Colombian.

On July 5, 2009, Yankovich fought with the US and WIBA champion Holly Holm (a category above her weight) and suffered her first loss in boxing, by doctor's stoppage.

On May 29, 2010, after nearly a year away from the ring due to injury suffered in the last fight held in the United States, Yankovich eventually lost her World Champion title to Esther Phiri in Lusaka, Zambia, in a defeat on points by a unanimous decision.

On April 29, 2011, Yankovich tried to win the WBC World Title. She lost the fight to Anne Sophie Mathis in Paris, France, in a defeat by TKO.

Mixed martial arts
Yankovich trains at Team Nogueira, and made her MMA debut on September 8, 2012, at Bitetti Combat 12 against Jéssica Andrade. She lost by submission with a guillotine.

In search of her first win in MMA, Yankovich faced Daniela Cristina on March 9, 2013, at Bitetti Combat 14. She won by submission with an Americana. Yankovich has fought in promotions such as Invicta.

A Fazenda 4
Yankovich attended the fourth edition of reality television show A Fazenda (The Farm), where she was expelled after assaulting the participant Thiago Gagliasso during a test, in which participants competed in a basketball mini-championship in the pool. At one point, Yankovich argued that Thiago pulled her bikini, after which she slapped his head. According to the rules of A Fazenda, any kind of aggression is punished with immediate elimination.

Professional boxing record

Mixed martial arts record

|-
|Loss
| style="text-align:center;"|1–3
|Viviane Pereira 
|TKO (punches)
|Bitetti Combat 17
|
| style="text-align:center;"| 2
| style="text-align:center;"| 2:49
|Rio de Janeiro, Brazil
|
|-
|Loss
| style="text-align:center;"|1–2
|Miriam Nakamoto
|TKO (knee and punches)
|Invicta FC 6: Coenen vs. Cyborg
|
| style="text-align:center;"| 1
| style="text-align:center;"| 2:08
|Kansas City, Missouri, United States
|
|-
|Win
| style="text-align:center;"|1–1
|Daniela Cristina
|Technical Submission (americana)
|Bitetti Combat 14
|
| style="text-align:center;"| 2
| style="text-align:center;"| 3:59
|Rio de Janeiro, Brazil
|
|-
|Loss
| style="text-align:center;"|0–1
|Jéssica Andrade
|Submission (guillotine choke)
|Bitetti Combat 12
|
| style="text-align:center;"| 1
| style="text-align:center;"| 3:02
|Rio de Janeiro, Brazil
|
|}

References

External links

 

1976 births
Living people
Bantamweight mixed martial artists
Mixed martial artists utilizing boxing
Mixed martial artists utilizing karate
Brazilian women boxers
Brazilian female karateka
Brazilian female mixed martial artists
Sportspeople from Jagodina
Lightweight boxers
Participants in Brazilian reality television series
Serbian women boxers
Serbian emigrants to Brazil
Serbian female karateka
Serbian female mixed martial artists
World boxing champions